Elaine Carter may refer to:

Elaine Carter, character, see John Carter (ER)
Elaine Carter, character in Alias a Gentleman
Elaine Carter (political candidate), in Harborough local elections
Elaine Carter, character in Pacific Rendezvous